Destroyer Squadron 60 (DESRON 60) is a destroyer squadron of the United States Navy. Destroyer Squadron 60 is one of three U.S. Navy destroyer squadrons permanently based outside the continental United States.

World War Two
During World War Two, Destroyer Squadron 60 consisted two destroyer divisions, the 119th and 120th, under the overall command of Captain William L. Freseman. 
Destroyer Squadron 60, World War Two

Destroyer Squadron 60 was part of the naval force assigned to Omaha Beach during the Normandy invasion of June 1944.  On 6 June 1944, the Meredith struck a mine, and after being towed to the Bay of the Seine, sank on 9 June 1944.  DESRON 60 subsequently was part of Task Force 129 which carried out the shore bombardment of the French seaport Cherbourg.

During the Pacific War, Destroyer Squadron 60 initially participated in the Philippines campaign.  The squadron was part of the escort screen for Task Group 78.3, the amphibious assault force that invaded Leyte in October 1944.  The squadron also participated in the ensuing Battle of Ormoc Bay. On 3 December 1944, during an attack on a Japanese convoy, the Cooper was torpedoed and sunk.  Destroyer Squadron 60 subsequently operated as part of the destroyer screen for Task Group 77.2, the Bombardment and Fire Support Group for the January 1945 Invasion of Lingayen Gulf (pictured).

Destroyer Squadron 60 next operated with Task Force 38, the U.S. Third Fleet's Fast Carrier Task Force.  On 16–17 February 1945, TF-38 flew air strikes against the Japanese home islands, Bonin Islands, and Volcano Islands to prevent any reinforcements of the Japanese garrison on Iwo Jima.  During this period, Barton and Ingraham collided, and Moale was detached to escort the two damaged destroyers back to Saipan for repairs.

Destroyer Squadron 60 then operated off Okinawa during Operation Iceberg, with Destroyer Division 120 serving as the escort screen for Task Group 52.1, the escort carrier group providing carrier-based close air support to the Allied invasion force.

Re-establishment 2003
On 19 February 2003, Destroyer Squadron 60 was re-established as a permanently assigned, forward-based destroyer squadron staff. It was initially based in Gaeta, Italy, the headquarters of the United States Sixth Fleet. At that time, the squadron's mission was described as to provide the Commander United States Sixth Fleet with a permanently assigned, forward-based destroyer squadron staff for the operational control over destroyers and frigates deployed to the Mediterranean Sea.
Destroyer Squadron 60, Present day

With the courtesy title of commodore, the commander of Destroyer Squadron 60 (COMDESRON 60) not only oversees U.S. 6th Fleet surface naval warfare operations in the Mediterranean Sea but also throughout Europe and Africa. The squadron commodore also additionally serves as the executive assistant to the commander of U.S. Naval Forces Europe-Africa as well as the NATO commander of Allied Joint Force Command Naples for such exercises. In the latter NATO role, Commodore James Aiken (pictured) acted as the exercise director for Exercise Sea Breeze 2014, the annual multinational  maritime exercise held in the Black Sea involving Standing NATO Maritime Group 2, NATO member navies, and navies involved in the Partnership for Peace initiative. 

Commander Destroyer Squadron 60 conducts combat and/or non-combat operations in his operational role as Commander Task Force 65 or as Sea Combat Commander, and when directed, as Maritime Interception Operations Commander. Depending on the missions to be undertaken, Task Force 65 employs surface warships, submarines, aircraft, SEAL teams, U.S. Marines, U.S. joint forces, and NATO forces assigned to the Sixth Fleet's  area of operations to keep open the sea lines of communications throughout the U.S. European Command's area of responsibility.

2013 saw two major changes on the command responsibilities for the squadron: 
 On 21 March 2013, the billet of Commander Destroyer Squadron 60 was renamed Commander Task Force 65, with Task Force 65 being the designation for the Sixth Fleet's surface combatant force. 
 On 9 May 2013, Commander Destroyer Squadron 60 (COMDESRON 60) was formally re-established to provide type-command administrative oversight for those four BMD-capable destroyers assigned to the squadron.

In this new "type" capacity, COMDESRON 60 supervises the training, readiness, maintenance, schedules, material, supply, discipline, and morale for those assigned BMD-capable destroyers.  Commander Destroyer Squadron 60 continues to command Task Force 65 in a "dual-hatted" role from two locations. The staff of Destroyer Squadron 60 is located in Rota, Spain and the staff of Task Force 65 is located in Naples, Italy. .

Africa Partnership Station

On 29 October 2007, the first Africa Partnership Station (APS) began under the command of Captain John Nowell, who was serving as Commander Destroyer Squadron 60 at the time. The APS task group, CTF-365, departed from Naples, Italy, with the dock landing ship  (pictured) serving as its flagship and accompanied by the high-speed support ship .  En route to the region, the Fort McHenry augmented its passenger list with specialists from France, Germany, the United Kingdom and Spain and officers from Nigeria, Cameroon and Ghana. Denmark, Italy and Portugal were also provided military staff support.  During its seven-month deployment, CTF-365 visited Senegal, Liberia, Ghana, Cameroon, Gabon, Angola, and Sao Tome and Principe. Africa Partnership Station 2007 developed cooperative partnerships among the regional maritime services while improving safety and security for the host nations. APS 2007 also supported over 20 humanitarian assistance projects during this deployment.

During her tour as Commander Destroyer Squadron 60, then-Captain Cynthia N. Thebaud commanded two multi-national African Partnership Station deployments that focused on maritime security capacity-building in West and Central Africa.

Commander John D. Tolg, commanded the 2009 USNS SWIFT Africa Partnership Station (APS) to West Central Africa, the deployment focused on maritime security capacity-building in West and Central Africa while embarking over 100 international sailors from 7 countries for Visit Board and Search (VBSS) operations.  The SWIFT visited 10 West Central Africa countries engaging with Heads of State, Ambassadors and Senior Military representatives.

European Phased Adaptive Approach

On 5 October 2011, U.S. Secretary of Defense Leon Panetta announced that the United States Navy will station four Aegis Ballistic Missile Defense System warships at Naval Station Rota, Spain, to strengthen its presence in the Mediterranean Sea and bolster the ballistic missile defense (BMD) of NATO as part of the European Phased Adaptive Approach (EPAA) missile defense program. On 16 February 2012, it was reported that the s Donald Cook and Ross (pictured) will be relocated to Rota during Fiscal Year 2014, followed by Porter and Carney (pictured) in fiscal year 2015. On 9 May 2013, Commander Destroyer Squadron 60 was formally designated to perform type-command administrative oversight for the four BMD-capable destroyers based at Rota, Spain.

On 31 January 2014, the first BDM-arm destroyer, the Donald Cook, departed Naval Station Norfolk, Virginia, for its new home-port of Rota, Spain.  On 3 June 2014, the next BDM-arm destroyer, the Ross, departed Naval Station Norfolk, Virginia, for its new home-port of Rota, Spain, arriving on 16 June 2014.  The third destroyer, the Porter, joined Destroyer Squadron 60 on 30 April 2015.  The final destroyer, USS Carney, arrived at Rota, Spain, on 25 September 2016, completing the forward deployment of Destroyer Squadron 60 to the European Phased Adaptive Approach mission.

2013 Ghouta chemical attack

The U.S. Navy initially delayed the departure of the Aegis-equipped guided-missile destroyer  from the U.S. Sixth Fleet amid allegations that the regime of Syrian president Bashar al-Assad used chemical weapons during the ongoing Syrian civil war, including the gas attacks that occurred on 21 August 2013. All four destroyers are capable of intercepting ballistic missiles as well as launching land-attack Tomahawk cruise missiles.

On 4 September 2013, the US Navy announced that USS Mahan had departed for its home-port of Naval Station Norfolk, Virginia, leaving four Burke-class destroyers operating in the Eastern Mediterranean. On 13 September 2013, the Mahan returned to Naval Station Norfolk, Virginia, completing an -month deployment with the U.S. Sixth Fleet.

On 12 September 2013, the U.S. Department of Defense announced that the remaining four Burke-class destroyers will remain in the eastern Mediterranean as Russian and American diplomats negotiate the turn-over of Syria's stockpile of chemical weapons to the United Nations, with Pentagon spokesman George E. Little noting: "We have no plans at this time to change our military posture in the Mediterranean.  We’re prepared for any potential military contingencies that might involve Syria."  On 31 October 2013, the Organisation for the Prohibition of Chemical Weapons announced that all declared equipment and facilities related to Syria's chemical weapons production have been destroyed.

2014 Black Sea incident

On 14 March 2014, Desron-60 guided-missile destroyer  departed for its first patrol as a forward deployed naval vessel of the U.S. Sixth Fleet.  On 10 April 2014, Donald Cook entered the Black Sea.  A Department of Defense spokesman said the deployment of the Donald Cook to the Black Sea was "to reassure NATO allies and Black Sea partners of America’s commitment to strengthen and improve interoperability while working towards mutual goals in the region."

On 12 April 2014, the Donald Cook was operating in the western Black Sea when a pair of  unarmed Russian Su-24 Fencer attack aircraft enter the area.  One Su-24 left its formation and began to fly closer to the Donald Cook.  A total of twelves passes took place over a 90-minute period, and the Russian aircraft approached within about 1,000 yards of the Donald Cook.

In the aftermath of this incident, Pentagon spokesman Colonel Warren stated: "This provocative and unprofessional Russian action is inconsistent with international protocols and previous agreements on the professional interaction between our militaries."  On 14 April 2014, the Donald Cook paid a port call at Constanța, Romania, which included a visit by Romanian president Traian Băsescu.  The Donald Cook conducted a multilateral training exercise with the Romanian warships  Regina Maria and Mărășești, as well as the frigate .

The Donald Cook departed the Black Sea on 24 April 2014. After a port visit to Durres, Albania, and training with Albanian forces, the Donald Cook returned to Rota, Spain, on 25 July 2014, completing its first forward-based deployment. Donald Cooks next Black Sea cruise, 28 December 2014 to 14 January 2015, transpired without incident.

2015 Black Sea incident
On 21 May 2015, the destroyer  entered the Black Sea to conduct joint operations with NATO and regional navies as part of Operation Atlantic Resolve.  On 25 May 2015, the Ross began a 3-day training exercise with the frigates Regina Maria and Mărășești of the Romanian Navy.

On 30 May 2015, the Ross was over-flown by Russian Su-24 Fencer aircraft while the ship was underway in the Black Sea. In its 31 May 2015 press release, the U.S. Navy noted that:
Ross observed the routine flights of SU-24 aircraft and had no interaction while both operated in international waters. Ross continued on her mission after observing the aircraft return to base. At no time did Ross act aggressively nor did she deviate from her planned operations. The conduct of her crew has been and continues to be professional.

On 1 June 2015, U.S. Defense Department spokesman Colonel Steven Warren, U.S. Army, further noted that the Russian military aircraft in the incident "were naked. In other words, no weapons aboard, no weapons on her wings." Also on that date, the U.S. Navy released a video of the Russian aircraft overflight. Finally, on this date, the Ross began a two-day naval exercise with the Ukrainian frigate Hetman Sahaydachniy (pictured). On 3 June 2015, the Ross departed the Black Sea, concluding an 11-day cruise.

2015 NATO Exercise Sea Breeze
The squadron's destroyer  entered the Black Sea on 5 July 2015 to join Dutch frigate Tromp, the  Portuguese frigate D. Francisco de Almeida, and Spanish minesweeper Tajo for the NATO Exercise Sea Breeze 2015. The exercise was planned to include 30 ships and around 1,700 personnel from Greece, Bulgaria, Turkey, the Netherlands, Spain, and the United States, as well as NATO's Standing NATO Maritime Group 1 and Standing NATO Mine Countermeasures Group 2.  Sea Brezze 2015 was scheduled to take place between 3–12 July 2015.

2017 Attack on Shayrat Airfield

The missile barrage was in response to the death of at least 80 civilians in the immediate aftermath of 4 April 2017, Khan Shaykhun chemical attack in Idlib province, an attack that the US government concluded was launched by the Syrian regime, from Shayrat.

2018 Black Sea Operations
On 16 February 2018,  joined  in the Black Sea near Russia for an "unspecified regional proactive presence mission". The move follows increased tensions between Russia and the U.S. after American federal prosecutors announced indictments against 13 Russian citizens for their alleged interference in the 2016 U.S. presidential campaign. The destroyers also arrived in the Black Sea during the fourth anniversary of the 2014 Winter Olympics at Sochi, Russia. Speculation that successful hosting of the 2014 Winter Olympic games provided President Vladimir Putin with the nationalist support he needed to proceed with the forced annexation of Crimea from Ukraine in 2014.

2020 Barents Sea Operations
In late April 2020, the destroyers ,  and  operated with the fast combat support ship , a U.S. nuclear-powered submarine, and a P-8A maritime patrol aircraft above the Arctic Circle after completing training together as part of the Submarine Command Course (SMCC) sponsored the Royal Navy. In May 2020, the three U.S. destroyers and the Supply operated in the Barents Sea with the British frigate  to "assert freedom of navigation and demonstrate seamless integration among allies", the first such operation in this area since the 1980s.

2021 Black Sea Operations
In February 2021,  and  took part in maneuvering exercises with the Romanian frigate Mărășești and Romanian Air Forces F-16 fighters in the Black Sea.

The two ships also participated in bilateral exercises with ships from the Bulgarian Navy and Turkish Navy as well as the Georgian Coast Guard. Previously,  also visited Batumi in February 2021.

List of commanders

See also
 1986 Black Sea incident
 1988 Black Sea bumping incident
 Aegis Ashore
 Montreux Convention Regarding the Regime of the Straits
 U.S.–Soviet Incidents at Sea agreement

Notes

References

External links
 
 

Destroyer squadrons of the United States Navy
Military units and formations established in the 1940s